Chattanooga Union order of battle may refer to:

 Wauhatchie Union order of battle
 Chattanooga-Ringgold Campaign Union order of battle